Cuming's blind snake (Ramphotyphlops cumingii) is a species of snake in the family Typhlopidae. The species is endemic to the Philippines.

Etymology
The specific name, cumingii, is in honor of English conchologist and botanist Hugh Cuming.

Geographic range
In the Philippines, R. cumingii is found on Bohol, Marinduque, Mindanao, Negros, Panay, and Polillo.

Habitat
The preferred natural habitat of R. cumingii is forest.

Reproduction
R. cumingii is oviparous.

References

Further reading
Boulenger GA (1893). Catalogue of the Snakes in the British Museum (Natural History). Volume I., Containing the Families Typhlopidae .... London: Trustees of the British Museum (Natural History). (Taylor and Francis, printers). xiii + 448 pp. + Plates I–XXVIII. (Typhlops cumingii, new combination, p. 51 + Plate III, figures 4a–4c).
Gray JE (1845). Catalogue of the Specimens of Lizards in the Collection of the British Museum. London: Trustees of the British Museum. (Edward Newman, printer). xxviii + 289 pp. (Onychophis cumingii, new species, p. 133).
Weinell JL, Hooper E, Leviton AE, Brown RM (2019). "Illustrated Key to the Snakes of the Philippines". Proceedings of the California Academy of Sciences, Fourth Series 66 (1): 1–49.

Ramphotyphlops
Reptiles described in 1845
Taxa named by John Edward Gray